Baby D is an English breakbeat hardcore and house music group, best known for their hit single "Let Me Be Your Fantasy" which hit number 1 on the UK chart in 1994.

Career
The group was formed by Production House Records, a record label set up in 1987 by former recording artist Phil Fearon, whose group Galaxy had had a number of hits in the 1980s. Involved with the rave scene, Production House's in-house record producer, Floyd Dyce, wrote and performed under several different names, including the House Crew, DMS and Xstatic.

Baby D were originally another outlet for his compositions, consisting of his wife, lead vocalist Dee Galdes-Fearon (a former member of Galaxy), Claudio Galdez on keyboards and windsynth and Terry Jones (stage name MC Nino) on vocals and keyboards. They appear on the track "Casanova" of Jazz & Bros Grimm released in 1989.

"Let Me Be Your Fantasy" reached number 1 on the UK Singles Chart in November 1994. The success continued with "(Everybody's Got to Learn Sometime) I Need Your Loving" (a 1995 cover of the Korgis classic), "So Pure" and "Take Me to Heaven", all included in the album Deliverance (1996). At the first MOBO Awards show in 1996 Baby D won in the category "Best Dance Act".

In 2000, a UK garage remix of "Let Me Be Your Fantasy" (courtesy of the Trick or Treat production team) made the UK Top 20. In 2004, the track was also covered by Ashley Jade but, although it made number 19 on the US Hot Dance Singles Sales chart, it did not make the main listing.

In the summer of 2008, the band performed at the UK dance music festival, Global Gathering. They continue to perform on the club and festival circuit. Dyce now runs his own record label, Redmaster, and still writes and produces, while Fearon still performs in the UK and Continental Europe. Jones also co-wrote "I Feel You" for Peter Andre, which peaked at number 1 on the UK charts, and remixed and produced for Eternal and the Backstreet Boys, as well as St. Etienne vocalist Sarah Cracknell.

Members
 Baby D (Dee Fearon) – vocals
 Claudio Galdez – keyboards, drum programming, windsynth
 MC Nino (Terry Jones) – vocals, keyboards, live drums

Former members
 Floyd Dyce – keyboards, live drums (left the group in 1993)

Discography

Studio albums

Singles

References

External links
 https://www.facebook.com/BabyDofficial

English house music groups
English electronic music groups
English dance music groups
English techno music groups
Hardcore techno music groups
Breakbeat hardcore music groups